Game day recycling is the idea that having large crowds of people in a small, concentrated space will generate great amounts of trash and products that need to be recycled. On college campuses with large stadiums, a home football game can attract up to about 110,000 people, like the University of Michigan’s stadium. However, because colleges only play a limited number of games at home each season, the recycling programs specifically for game days are usually specialized and separate from the school’s regular recycling program.

The primary reason for implementing game day recycling programs is to become a more sustainable campus.  Many college campuses implement game day recycling programs to deal with the large amount of trash and recycling generated by fans. Tailgaters bring copious amounts of food and refreshments, providing the greatest amount of waste during a gameday. Inside the stadium, programs, concessions, beverages and vending machine items also contribute to huge amounts of waste.

Definitions
Sustainable: of, relating to, or being a method of harvesting or using a resource so that the resource is not depleted or permanently damaged
Clearstreams: a recycling bag system that facilitates sorting and clean-up

Current Campus Programs

Harvard
History

Harvard began its sustainability efforts when a panel of students and faculty began meeting in 1999 to discuss ways the campus could become more green. The Harvard Green Campus Initiative began in 2001, which led to a greater need for a more central office for the sustainability efforts. The Harvard Office for Sustainability was established in fall 2008 and now oversees the game day recycling program.

Program

Harvard’s game day recycling program is supported by Harvard, the Office for Sustainability and the President’s office. On game days, Harvard provides **clearstream bags, recycling bins, and safety vests, gloves and “tailgate bags” for volunteers.

The Office for Sustainability recruits employees who have environmental knowledge, produced a game day recycling video and recruits volunteers for game days and other stadium events.
The President’s Office encourages all the departments to cut carbon and be green and the president attends all game days.
Harvard participated in the EPA’s Game Day Challenge in its first two years, 2009 and 2010. (see below).

University of Colorado
History

The University of Colorado established its recycling program in 1976. The recycling center works with many departments and student groups to accomplish its mission. It operates as a partnership between facilities management (run by the administration) and the student union.

Ralphie's Green Stampede  was formed in 2008 to deal specifically with game day recycling. It is a zero waste and carbon reduction program that begun at Folsom Field  during football games and now has expanded to include the Coors Events Center and all of CU’s sporting events. Its goal is to reach zero-waste at the stadium.  Folsom Field provides cups and food containers made from compostable materials and has “zero-waste” stations throughout the stadium. It was the first major sports stadium in the nation to run a zero-waste process.

Program

The CU game day recycling program’s accomplishments, which were outlined in its report to the EPA's GameDay Challenge includes having an 80-90 percent diversion, no public trashcans, about 25 attended zero-waste stations, more than 90 percent compostable or recyclable packaging and high and broad support.  The program involves its vendors for large events, encouraging them to provide packaging made with eco-friendly materials, compost their food waste, use bulk condiment dispensers, instruct their employees in proper recycling practices and track and report their annual progress. Ralphie’s Green Stampede also provided equipment, signage and posters to encourage and facilitate recycling.

University of Florida

The University of Florida TailGator Green Team was established in 2006  to manage waste at the Ben Hill Griffin Stadium during game days. It works to collect recyclable products generated by the masses of people surrounding the stadium while tailgating. The TailGator gameday recycling program relies on volunteers to operate. In its first year, it diverted over 26,500 pounds from the landfill. Since that first year,  the Green Team has collected 62.34 tons of recycling, which greatly reduced the waste produced on gamedays. Along with managing waste, the TailGator Green Team works to educate students on the proper ways of recycling. The team works in areas with high student concentrations based on where tailgates and other gameday events are occurring to tell individuals how and what to recycle.

EPA involvement
The EPA is a government agency whose purpose is to ensure the safety of humans and their environment. The EPA has implemented a Game Day Challenge in an effort to reduce the amount of waste accumulated during college football games. This Challenge is an initiative of the EPA’s WasteWise program. WasteWise is a free partnership program that assists its collaborators in meeting their specific goals to reduce and recycle industrial and municipal solid wastes. As part of the Game Day Challenge, colleges across the country compete to determine which university can reduce, reuse and recycle the most waste. Participating colleges and universities have the opportunity to design and implement a waste reduction program for one home football game during the month of October.  The schools need to measure the results by tracking and recording data on the amount of waste generated at the football game, the number of recyclables collected and the total number of people in attendance at the game. Once numbers are reported by the schools, the EPA announces the results and winners during the month of November.

Goals
The overall purpose of the Game Day Challenge is to reduce the amount of waste produced at college football games. The program hopes to increase awareness and expand participation by students, faculty, and the entire school community in waste reduction programs in an effort to make college campuses more sustainable.

History
The Game Day Challenge began in 2009 and eight schools participated.

The eight schools that participated were:
 Auburn University
 Brigham Young University
 Harvard University
 North Carolina State University
 Ohio University
 University of Colorado
 University of Michigan
 West Virginia University

By the 2010 challenge, the number of participating schools greatly increased. The number rose from 8 to 88 universities competing in the Game Day Challenge.

The 2010 schools are:
 Alcorn State University
 Appalachian State University
 Auburn University
 Baylor University
 Bowling Green State University
 Brigham Young University
 Bucknell University
 California Polytechnic State University
 Central Connecticut State University
 Central Michigan University
 Clemson University
 Duke University
 Eastern Michigan University
 Eastern Washington University
 Fairmont State University
 Florida A & M University
 Georgia Institute of Technology
 Harding University
 Harvard University
 Illinois State University
 Indiana University
 Iowa State University
 Ithaca College
 Kansas State University
 Lackawanna College
 Loras College
 Louisiana State University
 Marietta College
 Marist College
 Mesa Community College
 Middle Tennessee State University
 Montana State University
 North Carolina State University
 Northwest Missouri State University
 Northwestern University
 Ohio University
 Oregon State University
 Princeton University
 Purdue University - ICA
 Rice University
 Rutgers University
 Southern Illinois University Carbondale
 Southern Methodist University
 Syracuse University
 The Florida State University
 The Ohio State University
 The University of Alabama
 The University of Arkansas, Fayetteville
 The University of Central Oklahoma
 The University of Rhode Island
 The University of Tulsa
 Union College
 University at Buffalo
 University of California, Berkeley
 University of California, Davis
 University of Central Florida
 University of Florida
 University of Georgia
 University of Kentucky
 University of Maine
 University of Maryland
 University of Miami
 University of Michigan
 University of Minnesota
 University of Mississippi
 University of Missouri
 University of Montana
 University of Nebraska–Lincoln
 University of North Carolina - Chapel Hill
 University of North Texas
 University of Notre Dame
 University of Oregon
 University of Rochester
 University of South Florida
 University of Tennessee - Knoxville
 University of Tennessee at Martin
 University of Texas
 University of Virginia
 University of Washington
 Vanderbilt University
 Virginia State University
 Virginia Tech
 Washington State University
 West Virginia University
 West Virginia Wesleyan College
 Western Kentucky University
 Western New England College
 Yale University

Categories
The EPA divided the competition into five categories and awards are presented for each category.

1) Waste Generation
The Waste Generation category determines the ranks of schools by their per capita weight of waste generated. This is calculated by measuring the total waste produced, which includes trash, recyclables and compostables and dividing it by the total attendance at the game. This figure is the amount of waste that is produced per person at the game. The University with the lowest per capita waste generation wins the waste generation category.

2) Diversion Rate
The Diversion Rate category ranks schools based on their recycling rate, which is measured by comparing the amount of waste recycled to the total waste produced. The winner of this category is the school that has the largest recycling rate.

3) Greenhouse Gas Reduction
This category ranks schools based on their reductions in greenhouse gas emissions. As waste sits in municipal landfills, greenhouse gases are emitted into the atmosphere. However, when waste is recycled, these greenhouse gas emissions are reduced. The total reductions in emissions that are identified with the schools waste reduction accomplishments are calculated using the EPA’s WARM factors that are programmed in the WasteWise Re-TRAC system. The greenhouse gas reductions are divided by the total game attendance, in order to get a number for the greenhouse gas emission reductions per person. The school with the highest greenhouse gas reduction rate wins.

4) Recycling
The Recycling category ranks schools by the amount of material recycled per person. The weight of recycled material including paper, plastic, glass and cardboard will be totaled and divided by the number of people in attendance at the game. The winner of this category is the school that has the highest recycling rate.

5) Organics Reduction
Organics Reduction category bases their ranking on the per capita weight of reduced organics. The overall weight of reduced organics, which incorporates compostable materials that are either donated, reused, or composted will be divided by the number of people attending the game. The winner of this category is the school with the highest organic reduction rate.

Results for the 2009 EPA GameDay Challenge
In 2009, more than 40,000 pounds of waste were reduced through the combined efforts of the eight schools. This is equal to reducing greenhouse gas emissions by more than 105 metric tons. This number is comparable to the amount of greenhouse emissions that are produced annually from the consumption of about 12,000 gallons of gasoline or equal to the annual emissions generated from about 4,400 propane cylinders used to fuel gas grills.

The University of Colorado placed first in the categories of Diversion Rate, Gross Green House Gas Reductions through Waste Reduction and Per Capita Composting. Ohio University ranked first in Per Capita Waste Generation. Harvard University took the first place rank in Per Capita Recycling.

The results from the 2010 Game Day Challenge will be posted on the EPA website on November 30, 2010.

References 

Recycling in the United States